Michael Walpole (1570–1624?), was an English Jesuit and controversialist.

Life
Walpole, youngest of the four brothers of Henry Walpole, was baptised at Docking, Norfolk, on 1 Oct. 1570. When John Gerard landed in Norfolk in 1588, he made the acquaintance of the Docking household, and young Michael attached himself to the Jesuit. When Henry Walpole was taken prisoner at Flushing, Michael went to his assistance and procured his ransom.

He entered the Society of Jesus on 7 Sept. 1593. Doña Luisa de Carvajal came to England in 1606, and he appears to have been her confessor or spiritual adviser. In 1610, while in attendance on this lady, he was arrested and thrown into prison; but on the intervention of the Spanish ambassador Gondomar he was released, though compelled to leave the country.

In 1613, he returned to England in company with Gondomar, when Doña Luisa's house was broken into and the lady imprisoned. Walpole very narrowly escaped arrest. When Doña Luisa died in 1614, Walpole was with her, and he accompanied her body on its removal to Spain next year, and died some time after 12 Aug. 1624.

Works
Walpole wrote a number of books, including:

 A Treatise on the Subjection of Princes to God and the Church, St. Omer, 1608, 4to. 
 Five Books of Philosophical Comfort, with Marginal Notes, translated from the Latin of Boethius, London, 1609, 8vo. 
 Admonition to the English Catholics concerning the Edict of King James, St. Omer, 1610, 4to. 
 The Lyf of the Mother Teresa of Jesus (Mechelen: Henry Jaye, 1611), the first English translation of the autobiography of Teresa of Avila
 Anti-Christ Extant, against George Downham, St. Omer, 1613–14, 2 vols. 4to; 2nd edit. 1632. 
 Life of St. Ignatius of Loyola, St. Omer, 1616, 12mo: a translation of Ribadeneyra, which was often reprinted.

References

1570 births
1614 deaths
16th-century English Jesuits
17th-century English Jesuits
Spanish–English translators
Latin–English translators
17th-century translators
People from Docking, Norfolk
People educated at Norwich School